Stanisław Abłamowicz (1844–1901) was a Polish political activist and lawyer. A member of the January Uprising, he was imprisoned, and from 1870 to exile; was a defender in the political process in Krakow, an activist of the Gymnastic Society "Sokół".

References

1844 births
1901 deaths
Lawyers from Kraków
January Uprising participants
Burials at Rakowicki Cemetery